Karma is a 2012 Sri Lankan Sinhala adult drama film directed by Prasanna Jayakody and co-produced by Ceylon Theater Pvt. Ltd, Sky Entertainers Pvt. Ltd and Magic Lantern Pvt. Ltd. It stars popular musician Nadeeka Guruge in his debut role in cinema and Michelle Herft in lead roles along with Jagath Manuwarna. Music co-composed by Nadeeka Guruge himself with Sumudu Guruge. It is the 1168th Sri Lankan film in the Sinhala cinema.

Plot

Piyal (Jagath) is a youth who dedicates his time to drama, living alone. He suffers from a feeling of guilty for not saving his mother from death. On the other side of the walls of his place, lives a couple: Amanda (Michelle) and Nadee (Nadeeka). Nadee, is Amanda's inattentive lover tells her to abort her child on both times she was to become pregnant. Amanda also suffers from cancer. Piyal feels curious about Amanda who is older than him and later on it turns into a sexual attraction. However it turns into empathy. As a result, Piyal starts to take care and treat Nadee as her mother to get away from his guilty feeling about his mother's death. Meanwhile, Nadee appears to embrace the guilty feeling that he did not care for his girl friend. Concentrating on the dualities of life, the movie takes the viewer through emotional turbulence.

Cast
 Nadeeka Guruge as Nadee
 Michelle Herft as Amanda
 Jagath Manuwarna as Piyal
 Avanthi Dilrukshika
 Nadeesha Yapage
 Buddhika Mahesh
 Eric Madanayake
 Lelum Rathnayake
 Priyantha Rathnayake

Song

International participation
 
 Pusan International Film Festival in South Korea
 São Paulo International Film Festival in Brazil
 Rotterdam International Film Festival in the Netherlands
 Chicago International Film Festival
 Bildrausch International Film Festival in Switzerland
 Marrakech International Film Festival in Morocco
 Isolacinema International Film Festival in Slovenia

Awards
 2013 Derana Lux Film Festival Award for the Best Sounds - Lionel Gunaratne and Sasika Ruwan

References

2012 films
2010s Sinhala-language films
Sri Lankan drama films
2012 drama films